Art LaFleur (September 9, 1943 – November 17, 2021) was an American character actor and acting coach.

Life and career
LaFleur was born in Gary, Indiana. He played football in 1962 as a redshirt at the University of Kentucky under Coach Charlie Bradshaw as chronicled in a 2007 book, The Thin Thirty. He was a sportscaster on ESPN and on CBS.

LaFleur has had many guest-starring roles on television series, including Angel and JAG. In 1983, he was cast in the ABC sitcom pilot Another Ballgame alongside Alex Karras and Susan Clark. The series went through many development changes before its fall premiere, with Emmanuel Lewis being added to the show and LaFleur being dropped from the regular cast. Once the final change to the series title was made (to Webster), LaFleur was kept only as a guest star in the pilot.

In 1993, LaFleur played baseball player Babe Ruth in The Sandlot. He had another notable role as the eccentric and obsessive character Red Sweeney (Silver Fox), in the 1995 family comedy film Man of the House. He also appeared in one episode of the television series M*A*S*H, in season 9 ("Father’s Day”) as an MP, looking for the people responsible for a stolen side of beef. LaFleur played US Army soldier, Mittens in the 1985 science fiction film Zone Troopers.

In addition to playing Babe Ruth, LaFleur also appeared as baseball player Chick Gandil of 1919 Black Sox infamy, in Field of Dreams. In terms of military and national security film roles he appeared as the White House's security chief in Disney's First Kid (1996), as "McNulty" in both Trancers (1985), Trancers II (1991) and as 1st Sgt. Brandon T. Williams in In the Army Now (1994). He played pilot, Jack Neely in Air America (1990), appeared as Banes in The Replacements (2000) and in Beethoven's 4th (2003) as Sergeant Rutledge. He also played Red Sweeney in Disney’s “Man of the House” in 1995.

LaFleur played a coach for the New York Yankees in the 1992 film, Mr. Baseball. He also appeared in The Santa Clause 2 in 2002 and The Santa Clause 3: The Escape Clause in 2006, both times as the tooth fairy. In 2005, he appeared in Hostage as a deputy sheriff of Bruce Willis. In 2009, he appeared in the Direct-to-DVD film Ace Ventura Jr: Pet Detective and in the Science-Fiction horror film "The Rig".

He also appeared on House M.D. in 2005 as Warner Fitch, in the episode entitled "Sports Medicine." He also appeared on Home Improvement as Jimbo in season 1 episode 7 (Nothing More Than Feelings).

The Gary SouthShore RailCats, LaFleur's hometown professional baseball team recognized him with a special bobblehead and first pitch ceremony on July 20, 2019. 

LaFleur died from atypical Parkinson's disease on November 17, 2021, at the age of 78.

Filmography

References

External links

1943 births
2021 deaths
American male film actors
American male television actors
Male actors from Indiana
University of Kentucky alumni
People from Gary, Indiana
Neurological disease deaths in California
Deaths from Parkinson's disease